Violeta Urtizberea (February 19, 1985) is an Argentine actress. She worked once again with her father in the 2012 telenovela Graduados.

Biography
She is the granddaughter of the journalist Raúl Urtizberea, daughter of the actor Mex Urtizberea and niece of the actor Gonzalo Urtizberea.

Career
She began working on Magazine for Fai in the channel Telefe, along her father Mex Urtizberea. She made other works with him, and then began her own career. She worked once again with her father in the 2012 telenovela Graduados.

Personal life
Since 2015, she has been in a relationship with the singer Juan Ingaramo. On September 20, 2019, she gave birth to the couple's first child, a girl, in the Clínica Suizo Argentina whom they called
Lila Ingaramo Urtizberea. She is a close friend of the actress Julieta Zylberberg.

Televisión

Movies

Theater

References

Argentine actresses
Living people
1985 births